In Heaven is a 1998 Austrian drama film directed by Michael Bindlechner. The plot of the film involves Csiwi, a 16-year-old boy who learns about life through unruly girlfriend and chastened buddy. The film was entered into the 1999 International Film Festival Rotterdam.

Plot
Csiwi (Xaver Hutter) is 14 and "borrows" his brother's car at night - thus not only driving around the suburban streets until dawn but also to find his way in life. When he meets Valeska (Sylvie Testud) – who seems to know her destination which she has identified on a postcard -  and Levi (Merab Ninidze) – who is tired of fighting and searching and wants to arrive only. Together they live through a summer of friendship at which end Csiw is alone again but finally knows his way.

Cast
 Sylvie Testud as Valeska
 Xaver Hutter as Civi
 Merab Ninidze as Levi

Themes

In Heaven is a coming of age story in which a rebellious young boy from the suburbs, Csiwi, encounters two people - Valeska and Levi - both in their desires and life goals pointing like signposts in a different direction. One summer, they experience the happiness of giving each other support and new hopes. But in the end each of them has to go his own way.
Bindlechner: 'What makes it worth while to tell the story of Csiwi, Levi and Valeska is that apparent happiness on the surface can hide the underlying drama right to the end - as so often in real life".

Critical reception
In Heaven received generally positive reviews  and was invited to more than twenty film festivals worldwide.

Awards

References

External links
 In Heaven, International Film Festival Rotterdam

German Wikipedia: Max Ophüls Prize Film Festival